The 67th edition of the KNVB Cup started on October 20, 1984. The final was played on June 6, 1985: FC Utrecht beat Helmond Sport 1–0 and won the cup for the first time. Replays were held if teams were tied after ninety minutes.

Teams
 All 18 participants of the Eredivisie 1984-85
 All 18 participants of the Eerste Divisie 1984-85
 28 teams from lower (amateur) leagues

First round
The matches of the first round were played on October 20 and 21, 1984. The last six matches were played about one month later, on November 17 and 18.

E Eredivisie; 1 Eerste Divisie; A Amateur teams

Replays

Second round
The matches of the second round were played on November 17 and 18, 1984.

Replay

Round of 16
The matches of the round of 16 were played on March 13, 1985.

Replays

Quarter finals
The quarter finals were played on March 27, 1985.

Replay

Semi-finals
The semi-finals were played on May 7, 1985.

Replays
The replays were played on May 21 and 22, 1985.

Final

FC Utrecht would play in the Cup Winners' Cup.

See also
Eredivisie 1984-85
Eerste Divisie 1984-85

External links
 Netherlands Cup Full Results 1970–1994 by the RSSSF

1984-85
1984–85 domestic association football cups
KNVB